Yaga & Mackie are a reggaeton duo from Puerto Rico. They are signed to Los Mackieavelikos Inc.

Discography
Studio albums

 2002: Sonando Diferente
 2004: Clase Aparte
 2005: La Moda
 2007: La Reunión
 2008: Los Mackieavelikos
 2012: Los Mackieavelikos HD

Singles
 "Munequita" (featuring Johnny Prez)
 "Tortura"
 "La Batidora (featuring Don Omar)
 "Vestido Blanco" (featuring Don Omar)
 "Muévete" (featuring Pitbull)
 "Buche y Pluma" (featuring Julio Voltio)
 "El Tren"
 "Nena Chula"
 "Bailando" (featuring Nina Sky)
 "Maulla" (featuring Daddy Yankee)
 "Pide Más" (featuring Zion)
 "Imposible Ignorarte" (featuring Zion & Lennox)
 "Aparentemente" (featuring Arcángel & De La Ghetto)
 "El Pistolón" (featuring Arcángel & De La Ghetto, Randy)
 "Block Party" (featuring Daddy Yankee)
 "Ponla Hay" (featuring Andy Boy)
 "El Día Nacional del Genero" (featuring Divino, La Sista, MJ, Trebol Clan, Mario VI, Jomar, De La Ghetto, Naldo, Jayko, & Jadiel)
 "Pa' Frontiarle A Cualquiera" (featuring Arcangel)
 "Veo Veo"
 "Nada Va Pasar" (featuring Arcangel)
 "Pa' Frontiarle A Cualquiera" (Remix) (featuring Arcangel, Poeta Callejero, Daddy Yankee, Cosculluela, L.T "El Unico", Franco El Gorila, R-1, Ñengo Flow)
 "Dejate De Hablar" (featuring L.T "El Unico", Mexicano 777, Ñengo Flow)
 "La Bellaquera" (Remix) (featuring Arcangel)
 "Flotando En Amor"
 "Nos Vamos De Shopping" (Remix) (featuring Opi, J Alvarez, Arcangel, Jory, Farruko)
 "Bella dama"
 "Acechándote"
 "El Torero"
 "Morir Perreando"
 "En Contra Del Viento"
 "Yo Quisiera" (featuring Tego Calderon)
 "Niña" (featuring Sir Speedy)
 "Sex"
 "Si Tu Me Calientas"
 "Haciendo El Amor"
 "A Ti No"
 "Mi Mujer"
 "Trin" (featuring Lui-G 21+)
 "Princesa"
 "Tocándose Toda"
 "Nunca Imagine" (featuring Golpe a Golpe)

References

Reggaeton duos
Puerto Rican musical duos
Puerto Rican reggaeton musicians
Musical groups established in 2001